Blaber or bláber may refer to:

 Archibald Blaber (1867–1905), an English cricketer who played for Sussex
 Blaber River, a minor river on the Isle of Man
 Blaber (gamer), a professional League of Legends player

See also
 Blab
 Blueberry